Mwingi Central is a constituency in Kenya. It is one of eight constituencies in Kitui County and includes the former constituency of Mwingi South. Since 2017, Gideon Mutemi Mulyungi has represented the constituency in the National Assembly.

References 

Constituencies in Kitui County